Dong Jue ( 220s–260s), courtesy name Gongxi, was an official and military general of the state of Shu Han in the late Three Kingdoms period of China. He continued serving as an official in the state of Cao Wei, which conquered Shu Han in 263.

Life
Along with Fan Jian, Dong Jue served as a clerk and registrar under Zhuge Liang, the Imperial Chancellor of Shu, during the Southern Campaign and Northern Expeditions. After Zhuge Liang's death in 234, he was appointed as Supervisor of the Masters of Writing and later as the Prefect of the Masters of Writing in 258 to replace Chen Zhi. He was later promoted to General-in-Chief and Senior General Who Assists the State. The Shu emperor Liu Shan also enfeoffed him as the Marquis of Nan District.

Dong Jue subsequently assisted the Shu general Jiang Wei in the defence of Jiange in 263. He also attempted to counsel Liu Shan, but was unable to mitigate the influence of the eunuch Huang Hao, whom Liu Shan trusted. Liu Shan ultimately relegated him to the task of book-keeping to reduce his interference in state affairs. After the fall of Shu, Dong Jue continued serving as an official in the Cao Wei state as a military adviser to the Chancellor of State and as a Regular Mounted Attendant.

See also
 Lists of people of the Three Kingdoms

References

 Chen, Shou (3rd century). Records of the Three Kingdoms (Sanguozhi).
 Pei, Songzhi (5th century). Annotations to Records of the Three Kingdoms (Sanguozhi zhu).

Year of birth unknown
Year of death unknown
Shu Han generals
Shu Han politicians
Politicians from Hubei
Generals from Hubei